Aaron John Boone (born March 9, 1973) is an American baseball manager and former infielder who is the manager of the New York Yankees in Major League Baseball (MLB). He previously played in MLB for 13 seasons from 1997 through 2009. As a player, Boone is most recognized for his 2003 campaign with the Yankees, during which he was an All-Star and hit the winning walk-off home run of the 2003 American League Championship Series.

Following the conclusion of his playing career, Boone was an analyst for ESPN's Sunday Night Baseball and Baseball Tonight from 2010 to 2017. He began serving as the Yankees' manager in 2018, leading the team to two 100-win records during his first two seasons and playoff appearances in all five.

Early life
Boone attended Villa Park High School in Villa Park, California. He batted .423 with 22 stolen bases for the school's baseball team in his senior year, and was named the Century League's co-player of the year. The California Angels selected Boone on the third day of the 1991 MLB draft, but he had no intention to sign a professional contract.

College career
He attended the University of Southern California (USC) and played college baseball for the USC Trojans. In 1993, he played collegiate summer baseball for the Orleans Cardinals of the Cape Cod Baseball League, where he was named a league all-star and helped lead Orleans to the league championship.

Professional career

Cincinnati Reds (1997–2003)
The Cincinnati Reds selected Boone in the third round of the 1994 MLB draft. Boone made his MLB debut in June 1997, and was ejected from the game after being called out sliding into home. On the last day of the 1998 season, the Reds started the only MLB infield composed of two sets of brothers: first baseman Stephen Larkin, second baseman Bret Boone, shortstop Barry Larkin, and third baseman Aaron Boone.

On September 22, 2002, Boone hit the last home run in Riverfront Stadium in the eighth inning of the Reds' 4–3 loss to the Philadelphia Phillies, a solo home run off reliever Dan Plesac. Boone hit a career-high 26 home runs in 2002, playing in all 162 games. The Reds named Boone their team's most valuable player. He appeared in the 2003 MLB All-Star Game.

New York Yankees (2003)
The New York Yankees acquired Boone from the Reds for Brandon Claussen, Charlie Manning and cash on July 31, 2003. In 54 games after the trade, he hit .254 with a .720 OPS, six home runs and 31 RBIs.

During Game 7 of the 2003 American League Championship Series (ALCS), Boone hit a walk-off home run in the 11th inning, off of Tim Wakefield, which gave the Yankees a 6–5 victory over the Boston Red Sox, thus prolonging the Curse of the Bambino. The New York Daily News dubbed the play the "Curse of the Boonebino". This home run was rated the ninth-best home run of all time on Baseball Tonight. Afterward, some Red Sox fans called Boone "Aaron Fucking Boone," much as they called Bucky Dent "Bucky Fucking Dent."

In January 2004, Boone tore the anterior cruciate ligament in his left knee during a pick-up basketball game. The game violated the standard MLB player contract, which forbids taking part in off-season basketball, skiing and surfing. The Yankees immediately hinted that they would terminate his contract.
Soon after trading for Alex Rodriguez to play third base, the Yankees released Boone on February 27, 2004.

Cleveland Indians (2005–2006)
Boone signed a two-year contract with the Cleveland Indians in June 2004. He earned $600,000 for 2004, $3 million for the 2005 season, and a club option for the 2006 season worth $4.5 million. After missing the entire 2004 season, Boone played 154 games in 2005. He batted .243 with 16 home runs and 60 RBIs. The Indians exercised an option on Boone's contract for the 2006 season. In his second season with Cleveland, he batted .251 with seven home runs.

Florida Marlins (2007)

On December 29, 2006, Boone signed a one-year contract with the Florida Marlins worth $925,000. He batted .286 in 69 games for the Marlins in 2007.

Washington Nationals (2008)
On December 6, 2007, Boone signed a one-year, $1,000,000 contract with the Washington Nationals. In 104 games, Boone hit .241 with 6 home runs and 28 RBIs in 2008.

Houston Astros (2009)
On December 18, 2008, Boone signed a one-year $750,000, plus incentives, deal with the Houston Astros. He played in only 10 games in 2009, reaching base only once—on a hit by pitch—in 14 plate appearances.

In March 2009, Boone underwent open-heart surgery to replace a bicuspid aortic valve, a condition that he has been aware of since childhood but which routine tests indicated had recently worsened. Boone stated that doctors told him he could play baseball when he recovered, but he was not sure if he would choose to do so. Boone returned to baseball on August 10, when he began his rehabilitation with the Corpus Christi Hooks, the Astros' Double-A minor league affiliate. He played five innings and was hitless in two plate appearances. Boone stated after the game that his goal was to return to the major leagues by September 1, the date that major league rosters expand. Boone was activated on September 1, and added to the Astros' expanded roster. On September 2, Boone made his season debut, playing at first base and going 0 for 3. On September 16, Boone stated that he was leaning towards retirement, and on October 4 he played his last game.

Broadcasting career
Boone served as a guest analyst for the MLB Network coverage of the 2009 ALCS between the New York Yankees and Los Angeles Angels of Anaheim.

On February 23, 2010, Boone announced his retirement and that he would become an analyst for ESPN. Boone appeared on Monday Night Baseball and for Baseball Tonights pregame show on Sunday night. Boone called the 2014 and 2015 World Series for ESPN Radio with play-by-play announcer Dan Shulman. He and Jessica Mendoza became color commentators on Sunday Night Baseball with Shulman in 2016. Boone and Shulman continued to call World Series games for ESPN Radio through 2017.

Managerial career

2018 season
After the 2017 season, the Yankees decided not to retain Joe Girardi as their manager. The Yankees hired Boone to succeed him on December 4, 2017. The Yankees started the 2018 season with a 6–1 win against the Toronto Blue Jays on March 29, 2018. On September 2, 2018, Boone was suspended for one game for making illegal contact with an umpire. He finished his first season with a 100–62 record, good for second in the American League East, and led the Yankees to the wild card game against the Oakland Athletics, despite losing star outfielder and team leader Aaron Judge for two months with a wrist injury. On October 3, 2018, the Yankees defeated the Athletics 7–2 to advance to the American League Division Series, giving Boone his first postseason win as a manager. The Boston Red Sox eliminated the New York Yankees three–games–to–one in the American League Division Series.

2019 season

The Yankees started the 2019 season with a 7–2 win against the Baltimore Orioles on March 28, 2019. On September 19, after winning against the Los Angeles Angels 9–1, the Yankees clinched the American League East, becoming AL East Division Champions for the first time since 2012 and also earning their 100th win. Boone became the first manager in MLB history to have 100 or more wins in each of his first two seasons. The Yankees would go on to lose to the Houston Astros in the American League Championship Series.

Following the 2019 season, Boone was named a finalist for American League Manager of the Year award. He finished runner-up to Minnesota Twins manager, Rocco Baldelli.

2020 season 
Due to the COVID-19 pandemic, the Yankees as well as the other 29 Major League Baseball teams only played a 60-game regular season. The Yankees started off the shortened season with a hot 16–6 start, but then lost 15 out of their next 20 games evening their win loss record at 21–21. The Yankees then won 10 straight to finish the season 2nd in their division with a 33–27 record, seven games behind the division champion Tampa Bay Rays, who they lost eight of 10 games to in the regular season, in the AL East, but good enough for the 5th seed in the American League due to MLB's postseason expansion for the season. The Yankees would sweep the Cleveland Indians in a best-of-three Wild Card Series to advance to the American League Division Series against the Tampa Bay Rays, but their struggles against the Rays would continue, as they were eliminated in five games.

2021 season 
During the 2021 season, the Yankees had what was called one of the "streakiest [teams] in recent memory. Through July 4, the team struggled to a 41–41 record with half of the season left to play, then went on a 51–29 run to end the season at 92–70. Between August 14–28, the Yankees won 13 consecutive games, tied for fifth-longest in franchise history. Following the winning streak, the team stumbled, going 3–12 between August 28 and September 12, and finished tied for second in the American League East behind the Tampa Bay Rays, but lost the Wild Card Game to the Boston Red Sox 6–2.

Following the season, Boone signed a three-year contract with the Yankees with a club option for 2025.

2022 season 
In 2022 he was ejected nine times, four times more than any other major league manager. At the end of the regular season, the Yankees finished first in the AL East and earned home field advantage in Games 1, 2, and 5 of the ALDS. They beat the Cleveland Guardians in five games, but got swept by the Houston Astros in the ALCS, marking Boone's fifth straight playoff exit.

Managerial record

Personal life
Boone is the son of former catcher and manager Bob Boone, the brother of All Star and four-time Gold Glove winner Bret Boone, the brother of former Cincinnati Reds minor leaguer Matt Boone, and the grandson of former major leaguer Ray Boone. As children, Aaron and Bret spent time in the Phillies clubhouse with fellow sons of other major league players, including Pete Rose Jr.  Boone is a descendant of pioneer Daniel Boone.

Boone's wife, Laura Cover, was a Playboy Playmate (Miss October 1998). Boone lived in Scottsdale, Arizona until becoming Yankees manager, which he moved to Greenwich, Connecticut. Boone and Cover have four children: two biological children and two adopted.

Boone, who had open heart surgery in 2009, had surgery to implant a pacemaker in March 2021. Boone was quoted as feeling “awesome” after being on the bench for two weeks following the procedure.

See also
Third-generation Major League Baseball families

References

External links

, or Retrosheet

1973 births
Living people
National League All-Stars
Cincinnati Reds players
Cleveland Indians players
New York Yankees players
Florida Marlins players
Washington Nationals players
Houston Astros players
Major League Baseball third basemen
Chattanooga Lookouts players
Indianapolis Indians players
Louisville RiverBats players
Jupiter Hammerheads players
Columbus Clippers players
Orleans Firebirds players
USC Trojans baseball players
Baseball coaches from California
Baseball players from California
Major League Baseball broadcasters
MLB Network personalities
People from La Mesa, California
New York Yankees managers
Billings Mustangs players
Corpus Christi Hooks players
Gulf Coast Nationals players
Round Rock Express players
Winston-Salem Warthogs players
Anchorage Glacier Pilots players